"The Brain Center at Whipple's" is episode 153 of the American television series The Twilight Zone. It originally aired on May 15, 1964 on CBS.

Opening narration

Plot
In the future of 1967, Wallace V. Whipple, owner of a vast Midwestern manufacturing corporation, decides to upgrade his plant to increase output by installing a machine named the "X109B14 modified transistorized totally automatic assembly machine," which leads to tens of thousands of layoffs.  Some former employees try to convince him that the value of a man outweighs the value of a machine, but their protests fall on deaf ears.  His plant manager, Mr. Hanley, reminds him that Whipple's father, who ran the factory for 40 years, while profit-driven, had a sense of responsibility to his factory workers, and their pride in their work.  Whipple coldly responds that while his father only "doubled" his factory production, his competitors quadrupled theirs. Dickerson, an angry veteran foreman, tries to smash a machine but is shot and injured by Whipple. While Hanley visits Dickerson in the hospital, Whipple is only concerned about his equipment. Hanley confronts Whipple about it and is summarily fired after being shown the machine replacing him. Whipple proceeds to replace secretaries with automated dictation machines, thinking that powder room breaks and maternity leave are inconveniences.

Whipple eventually fires all his human employees after replacing them with machines, which then turn on him by spitting out the harsh demeaning recorded parting words of his former employees back at him over and over, driving Whipple to insanity.

Eventually, the board of directors find him neurotically obsessed with machines and retire him.  Whipple joins Hanley at the bar opposite his factory and expresses deep sorrow at his misfortune as he rambles about how it isn't fair that machines are replacing men, his poetic justice for caring more about machines in the first place. He also admits that he's lonely because he's not married and has no family and that he feels cast aside like a used part.

The last scene reveals Whipple's replacement to be a robot (Robby the Robot), which swings Whipple's key on a chain the same way he used to.

Closing narration

Cast
Richard Deacon as Wallace V. Whipple
 Paul Newlan as Walter Hanley
 Ted de Corsia as  Dickerson
 Thalmus Rasulala (credited as Jack Crowder) as Technician 
 Shawn Michaels as Bartender 
 Burt Conroy as Watchman
 Robby the Robot as himself

Production notes
The robot that ultimately replaces Mr. Whipple is "Robby the Robot" from the 1956 Sci-Fi film Forbidden Planet. "Robby" appeared in two other episodes of The Twilight Zone; Episode #2 "One for the Angels" (as a miniature toy) and episode #128 "Uncle Simon."

In popular culture
Sludge metal band Melvins named a song on their album Hostile Ambient Takeover after the episode.
The episode was parodied in the Futurama episode "Benderama".
 The name Whipple can be seen in various episodes of the third revival series.

References
DeVoe, Bill. (2008). Trivia from The Twilight Zone. Albany, GA: Bear Manor Media. 
Grams, Martin. (2008). The Twilight Zone: Unlocking the Door to a Television Classic. Churchville, MD: OTR Publishing. 
Zicree, Marc Scott: The Twilight Zone Companion.  Sillman-James Press, 1982 (second edition)

External links

1964 American television episodes
The Twilight Zone (1959 TV series season 5) episodes
Television episodes written by Rod Serling
Television episodes about termination of employment
Fiction set in 1967
Works about automation